Verners Edgards Kohs (born 21 May 1997) is a Latvian professional basketball player for Heroes Den Bosch of the BNXT League. He is a three-time Latvian League champion with VEF Riga.

Career 
Kohs came through the youth ranks of BK Ventspils, before joining VEF Rīga in 2013. He made his debut for VEF’s senior team during the 2014-15 season.

In January 2015, Kohs moved to Belgium, joining BC Oostende for a try-out, followed by a year in Spain, in which he mostly saw action for El Olivar Zaragoza in the LEB Silver, while appearing in one game for Liga ACB outfit CAI Zaragoza.

He moved to Prague in 2016, joining the Get Better Academy which competes in the country’s second tier. In July 2017, he was signed by Obradoiro CAB of the Spanish Liga ACB and was then sent to LEB Oro side Club Ourense Baloncesto on loan.

On 25 January 2022 he signed with Vanoli Cremona of the Italian Lega Basket Serie A (LBA).

On 8 September 2022 Kohs signed a one-year contract for Heroes Den Bosch of the BNXT League.

International career 
Representing Latvia, Kohs played at the 2013 under-16-, the 2015 under-18- and the 2016 under-20-European Championships.

References

External links 
 FIBA.com profile

1997 births
Living people
Basket Zaragoza players
BK VEF Rīga players
BK Ventspils players
Club Ourense Baloncesto players
Heroes Den Bosch players
Latvian expatriate basketball people in Spain
Latvian men's basketball players
Obradoiro CAB players
People from Ventspils
Power forwards (basketball)
Vanoli Cremona players